Sowle Nunatak is a nunatak situated in the Rambo Nunataks, lying 5.5 nautical miles (10 km) southeast of Wagner Nunatak on the west side of Foundation Ice Stream, in the Pensacola Mountains, Edith Ronne Land, Antarctica. The geographical feature was first mapped by United States Geological Survey (USGS) from surveys and U.S. Navy air photos, 1956–66. Named by Advisory Committee on Antarctic Names (US-ACAN) for Melvin L. Sowle, construction mechanic at Plateau Station, winter 1967.

Nunataks of Queen Elizabeth Land